Future Community Park 459 is a $51 million (CAD) approved park including "series of domes, artificial turfs, trails, and a community centre, set to begin construction in Mid-Late 2017, and be completed in 2019. The park is located in Churchill Meadows, Mississauga, Ontario. The centre is located at 5320 Ninth Line. The site is by relatively flat lands, and contains a protected wooded wetland. It is located between Highway 407 and a sixteen-mile creek to the west, and to the East, is the main part of the  Churchill Meadows community. The future facility is meant to be done in different phases over the years.

Ideas for Lot
In mid 2014, the City of Mississauga Ward 10 announced to local residents that they would be building a community park, including a recreational facility, and outdoor recreation as well. They would be building this at the Ninth Line corridor opposite Tacc Drive at its northern point and opposite Burdette Terrace toward the southern part. In late 2014, studies showed that a city-built and operated community centre is the preferred approach for the proposed indoor recreation facility in the city's northwest end. In September 2015, the city approved funding for a pool to be added to the community centre.

Design and Construction 
Ward 10 of Mississauga, Ontario held many public gatherings to discuss the community centre and its design. On December 15, 2016, a concept design photo of the development was released to the public. To date, $360,000 has been spent on the $51 million landmark project. Most of this expenditure is for design of the building, including the 25-metre pool, therapeutic tank and aquatic-related rooms.  The centre and area for phase one would include:
 Community centre - with pool, gymnasium and meeting space
 Two lit artificial turf soccer fields, one with a seasonal dome
 Natural area enhancements
 Multipurpose trails, measured loop trail
 Pond and overlook
 Temporary dog leash free zone
 Parks Operations space
 Site servicing, infrastructure and parking

The park is intended to be used by area residents and organized sports groups. It will be designed for all ages and abilities, offering a variety of recreational activities and neighbourhood amenities for year-round use.

The building was designed by Toronto, Ontario based MacLennan Jaunkalns Miller Architects and constructed by Brampton, Ontario based Aquicon Construction.

Community centre 
The community centre is intended to provide multi-use spaces for recreation and community use. Uses for the community centre identified through the public engagement process are being considered, along with the following proposed facilities:
 Gymnasium
 Community social / meeting space
 25 metre pool and warm water tank

Schedule of creation 
Park 459 will be developed in phases. Construction on Phase One started in the fall of 2018 and finished fall 2021. Future phases to provide additional amenities are dependent on future available funding.

Future Phases 
The design and construction of additional amenities at Park 459 will be determined in the future pending available funding. Uses identified through the public engagement process are being considered, along with the following proposed facilities subject to future available funding. So, the future amenities may include:
One lit multi-purposed sports field
One lit cricket pitch
Playground
Spray Pad
Four tennis courts
One basketball court
One skate park
Trails
Natural areas

References 

Community centres in Canada
Municipal parks in Ontario
Geography of Mississauga